The 1980 Toledo Rockets football team was an American football team that represented the University of Toledo in the Mid-American Conference (MAC) during the 1980 NCAA Division I-A football season. In their fourth season under head coach Chuck Stobart, the Rockets compiled a 4–7 record (3–6 against MAC opponents), finished in a tie for eighth place in the MAC, and were outscored by all opponents by a combined total of 190 to 187.

The team's statistical leaders included Jim Kelso with 589 passing yards, Mel Tucker with 563 rushing yards, and Rodney Achter with 269 receiving yards.

Schedule

References

Toledo
Toledo Rockets football seasons
Toledo Rockets football